Bass Player is a magazine for bassists. Each issue offers a variety of artist interviews, lessons, and equipment reviews. The magazine was founded in 1988 as a spinoff of Guitar Player magazine, with Jim Roberts as its first editor. The original headquarters was in San Francisco, CA. It began as a regular edition magazine in 1990.

Currently published by Future US, Bass Player held an annual event for bassists, Bass Player LIVE!. From 2004 until 2007 Bass Player LIVE! was held in New York City; from 2008 until 2017 it was held in Hollywood, California.

Editors
Jim Roberts, March 1990 to December 1996
Karl Coryat, January 1997 to January 1998
Richard Johnston, February 1998 to July 2001
Bill Leigh, August 2001 to March 2009
Jonathan Herrera, April 2009 to December 2010
Brian Fox, January 2011 to June 2014
Chris Jisi, July 2014 to October 2018
Joel McIver, November 2018 to date

Lifetime Achievement Awards
In most years since 1998, Bass Player has awarded Lifetime Achievement Awards to notable bassists, as follows:

 1998 Milt Hinton, Bobby Rodriguez
 1999 Chuck Rainey
 2000 Joe Osborn, Percy Heath
 2001 Jerry Jemmott, Leo Fender
 2002 [no award]
 2003 [no award]
 2004 Anthony Jackson, Will Lee (bassist)
 2005 Ron Carter, Jack Bruce
 2006 Stanley Clarke
 2007 Lee Sklar, Tony Levin
 2008 Carol Kaye, Verdine White, Mike Watt
 2009 Rocco Prestia, Charlie Haden
 2010 Bootsy Collins, Alphonso Johnson
 2011 Jack Casady, James Jamerson, Larry Graham
 2012 Chris Squire, Aston Barrett, Jaco Pastorius
 2013 Geezer Butler, Lee Rocker
 2014 Abe Laboriel, Sr
 2015 Lemmy, Nathan East, Louis Johnson
 2016 Billy Sheehan, George Porter Jr, Tim Bogert
 2017 Flea, Jimmy Johnson, Donald "Duck" Dunn
 2018 [no award]
 2019 John Patitucci
 2020 [no award]
 2021 Marcus Miller, Gail Ann Dorsey, John Taylor, Charles Berthoud

References

1988 establishments in California
Guitar magazines
Magazines established in 1988
Magazines published in San Francisco
Monthly magazines published in the United States
Music magazines published in the United States